Celler Perelada is an emblematic building in Peralada and state of the art in leaving a minimum environmental impact during winemaking process. It is committed to environmental balance within the DO Empordà and the first winery in Europe to receive the golden LEED certificate for Leadership in Energy and Environmental Design.

Building and design 
The Celler Perelada project was undertaken by family Suqué Mateu at a price of 40 million €. with standards aimed at achieving the improvement of the quality of its wines, returning to traditional systems. The winery was designed and building activities supervised by Rafael Aranda of RCR Arquitectes, recipients of the Pritzker Prize 2017. The ground-breaking ceremony took place in 2016 and the first vintage was in 2020. Creation aimed to be a benchmark for modern architecture that blends into the landscape while respecting the environment where it is located. For this reason, taking advantage of the unevenness of the land, it is half-buried up to 20 metres, which favours energy saving. The deep foundation of the winery allows interaction with geothermal layers. The building has 538 supports at a depth of between 8 and 20 metres, 331 of which are used as heat exchangers with the ground to reduce the consumption of heating, cooling and hot water, thus minimising energy consumption, resulting in a saving of around 37 %. Taking a holistic view of the water cycle, water consumption is reduced both inside the building through the combination of efficient taps and rainwater, and outside through an efficient irrigation system and the use of rainwater for gardening.  Water is collected from the rain in a 700-cubic-metre buffer pool. The building has low-consumption lighting and favours the entry and use of natural light through the roof and an advanced energy management system. In addition, 100% of the electricity consumption comes from certified renewable energy. 25 % recycled materials were used in the construction of the building. The building is an example of modern, functional design, adapted to the topography of the DO Empordà.
The building impresses with a clear design language that blends harmoniously into the surrounding landscape. Floor space is 18,200 square meter and provides a production capacity of over two million bottles per vintage.

References

Catalan wine
Sustainable building
Companies based in Catalonia
Wineries of Spain